Emanuele is the Italian form of Manuel. People with the name include:

 Carlo Emanuele Buscaglia (1915–1944), Italian aviator
 Emanuele Basile (1949–1980), captain of Carabinieri
 Emanuele Belardi (born 1977), Italian football player
 Emanuele Calaiò (born 1982), Italian football player
 Emanuele Canonica (born 1971), Italian professional golfer
 Emanuele Chiapasco (1930–2021), Italian baseball player and entrepreneur
 Emanuele Crialese (born 1965), Italian film screenwriter and director
 Emanuele d'Astorga (1681–1736), Italian composer
 Emanuele Filiberto, 2nd Duke of Aosta (1869–1931), eldest son of Amadeo I of Spain
 Emanuele Filiberto, Prince of Venice and Piedmont (born 1972), member of the House of Savoy
 Emanuele Filippini (born 1973), Italian football player
 Emanuele Gianturco (1857–1907), Italian legal scholar and politician 
 Emanuele Idini (born 1970), retired freestyle swimmer
 Emanuele Luzzati (1921–2007), Italian painter, production designer, illustrator, film director and animator
 Emanuele Manitta (born 1977), Italian football goalkeeper
 Emanuele Merisi (born 1972), Italian former professional swimmer
 Emanuele Naspetti (born 1968), racing driver
 Emanuele Nicosia (1953–2016), automobile designer
 Emanuele Nutile (1862–1932), Italian writer and composer
 Emanuele Pesaresi (born 1976), Italian football player
 Emanuele Pesoli (born 1980), Italian football defender
 Emanuele Pirro (born 1962), Italian auto racing driver
 Emanuele Repetti (1776–1852), historian
 Emanuele Severino (1929–2020), contemporary Italian philosopher

Surname
 Vittorio Emanuele, Count of Turin (1872–1946), grandchild of King Victor Emmanuel II
 Vittorio Emanuele, Prince of Naples (born 1937), last Crown Prince of Italy
 Vittorio Emanuele Orlando (1860–1952), Italian diplomat and political figure

See also
 Emanuel
 Immanuel
 Manuel (name)
 Manuele
 Manuelle

Italian masculine given names
Surnames of Italian origin
Theophoric names